The Ohio Attorney General is the chief legal officer of the State of Ohio in the United States.  The office is filled by general election, held every four years.  The  Ohio Attorney General is Republican Dave Yost.

History
The office of the attorney general was first created by the Ohio General Assembly by statute in 1846. The attorney general's principal duties were to give legal advice to the state government, to represent the state in legal matters, and to advise the state's county prosecutors.  Originally, the attorney general was appointed by the legislature. With the adoption of Ohio's second constitution in 1851, the attorney general became an elected office. The attorney general's duties were drawn very generally at that time.

In 1952, the General Assembly passed a statute that added to the attorney general's responsibilities, including trusteeship over charitable trusts, and legal advice to more government agencies. The act stated that the attorney general could prosecute individuals only if the governor requested so in writing. Starting in 1954, the term of office was increased from two years to four years.

In 2008 Nancy H. Rogers was appointed following the resignation of Marc Dann. A special election was held in 2008 to find a permanent replacement; then–Ohio State Treasurer Richard Cordray (D) beat out Michael Crites (R), and  Robert M. Owens (I) for the position.

The Solicitor General of Ohio is the top appellate lawyer in the attorney general's office.

In November 2014, Ohio Attorney General DeWine secured a $22 million settlement from the credit score company ScoreSense, which is owned by the company One Technologies.  DeWine had filed civil charges against the company along with the Illinois attorney general and Federal Trade Commission. Ohio consumers and state government will receive a portion of the settlement. According to the FTC, One Technologies "lured customers with "free access" to their credit scores and then billed them a recurring fee of $29.95 per month..." Over 200,000 consumers had filed complaints against the company.

List of attorneys general of Ohio (1846–present)

Elections

The voters of the U.S. state of Ohio elect an attorney general for a four-year term. The winning candidate is shown in bold.

Notes

References

External links
 Ohio Attorney General official website
 Ohio Revised Code at Law.Justia.com
 U.S. Supreme Court Opinions - "Cases with title containing: State of Ohio" at FindLaw
 Ohio State Bar Association
 Ohio Attorney General Mike DeWine profile at National Association of Attorneys General
 Press releases at Ohio Attorney General

 
1846 establishments in Ohio